Sarab-e Rofteh Khan (also Romanized as Sarāb-e Rofteh Khān, Sarāb-e Rafkhān, Sarāb-e Raft Khān, Sarāb-e Roftkhān, and Sarab-i-Rafkhan) is a village in Teshkan Rural District, Chegeni District, Dowreh County, Lorestan Province, Iran. At the 2006 census, its population was 466, in 98 families.

References 

Towns and villages in Dowreh County